Oxycera analis, the dark-winged soldier, is a species of soldier fly.

Distribution
This rather rare species can be found in most of Europe and in the Near East.

Habitat
These soldier flies usually inhabit woodland springs, calcareous seepages, small streams and sometimes fens and marshes.

Description
In males of these medium-small soldier flies the body is almost entirely black, but the scutellar tubercles can be yellowish. In any case in the females the apex of tergite 5 of the scutellum is yellowish. Moreover the scutellum has two spines. Also the abdomen is black with a single apical spot, rarely with yellow side-markings. Antennal apical consists of the two last flagellomeres. Wings show a distinct dark cloud in the otherwise clear wings.

Biology
Adults of Oxycera analis can be found in Summer, with a peak in June and July. Larvae live in the sediments and mosses associated with wetlands.

References

Stratiomyidae
Diptera of Europe
Insects described in 1822
Taxa named by Christian Rudolph Wilhelm Wiedemann